The Canadian Football League (CFL) is a professional sports league in Canada. The CFL is the highest level of competition in Canadian football. The league consists of nine teams, each located in a city in Canada. They are divided into two divisions: four teams in the East Division and five teams in the West Division.

As of 2022, it features a 21-week regular season in which each team plays 18 games with three bye weeks. This season traditionally runs from mid-June to early November. Following the regular season, six teams compete in the league's three-week playoffs, which culminate in the Grey Cup championship game in late November. The Grey Cup is one of Canada's largest annual sports and television events.

The CFL was officially named on January 19, 1958, upon the merger between the Interprovincial Rugby Football Union or "Big Four" (founded in 1907) and the Western Interprovincial Football Union (founded in 1936).

History

Early history

Rugby football began to be played in Canada in the 1860s, and many of the first Canadian football teams played under the auspices of the Canadian Rugby Football Union (CRFU), founded in 1884. The CRFU was reorganized as the Canadian Rugby Union (CRU) in 1891, and served as an umbrella organization for several provincial and regional unions. The Grey Cup was donated by Governor General the Earl Grey in 1909 to the team winning the Senior Amateur Football Championship of Canada. By that time, the sport as played in Canada had diverged markedly from its rugby origins with the introduction of the Burnside rules, and started to become more similar to the American game.

For much of the early part of the 20th century, the game was contested by intraprovincial leagues, or unions. In 1907, several of the stronger senior clubs in Ontario and Quebec formed the Interprovincial Rugby Football Union (IRFU or Big Four). It took almost 30 years for an elite interprovincial western union to emerge, when in 1936 the stronger senior clubs in Manitoba, Alberta and Saskatchewan formed the Western Interprovincial Football Union (WIFU). From the 1930s to the 1950s, the Big Four and WIFU gradually evolved from amateur to professional leagues, and amateur teams were no longer competitive for the Grey Cup. Apart from the World War II years, an amateur team last won the Grey Cup in 1936.

By the end of World War II, the WIFU's play was at the same level as that of the Big Four. Within a few years after the return of peace, both interprovincial unions had turned openly professional. However, while the Big Four champion got an automatic berth to the Grey Cup final, until 1954 the WIFU's champion had to play in a semi-final against the champion of the Ontario Rugby Football Union (ORFU)–by then, the only amateur union still competing for the Grey Cup. The ORFU withdrew from Grey Cup competition after the 1953 season, and the WIFU champion was given an automatic berth in the Grey Cup final. For this reason, 1954 is reckoned as the start of the modern era of Canadian football, in which the Grey Cup has been exclusively contested by professional teams. Since 1965, Canada's top university football teams, competing in what is now U Sports, have competed for the Vanier Cup.

In 1956, the IRFU and WIFU formed a new umbrella organization, the Canadian Football Council (CFC). In 1958, the CFC left the CRU and reorganized as the Canadian Football League. As part of an agreement between the CRU and CFL, the CFL took possession of the Grey Cup, and the amateurs were officially locked out of Grey Cup play. However, the Grey Cup had been the de facto professional championship since 1954. The CRU remained the governing body for amateur play in Canada, eventually adopting the name Football Canada. Initially, the two unions remained autonomous, and there was no intersectional play between eastern (IRFU) and western (WIFU) teams except at the Grey Cup final. This situation was roughly analogous to how Major League Baseball operated for almost all of the 20th century, and how the AFL and NFL operated during the 1960s prior to those leagues' 1970 merger.

The IRFU was renamed the Eastern Football Conference in 1960, while the WIFU was renamed the Western Football Conference in 1961. Also in 1961, limited intersectional play was introduced. Because the West played 16 games by this time while the East still only played 14, this arrangement oddly allowed both the four-team Eastern Conference and the five-team Western Conference to play three games per intraconference opponent and one game per interconference opponent. It was not until 1974 that the East expanded its schedule to 16 games, just like the West. In 1981, the two conferences agreed to a full merger, becoming the East and West Divisions of the CFL. With the merger came a fully balanced and interlocking schedule of 16 games per season (with all nine teams playing each other twice, once at home and once on the road). Since 1986 (with exception of 2021), the CFL's regular season schedule has been 18 games.

The separate histories of the IRFU and the WIFU accounted for the fact that two teams had basically the same name: the IRFU's Ottawa Rough Riders were often called the "Eastern Riders", while the WIFU's Saskatchewan Roughriders were called the "Western Riders" or "Green Riders". Other team names had traditional origins. With rowing a national craze in the late 19th century, the Argonaut Rowing Club of Toronto formed a rugby team for its members' off-season participation. The football team name Toronto Argonauts still remains even though it and the rowing club have long since gone their separate ways. After World War II, the two teams in Hamilton—the Tigers and the Flying Wildcats—merged both their organizations into the Hamilton Tiger-Cats.

The league remained stable with nine franchises—the BC Lions, Calgary Stampeders, Edmonton Eskimos, Saskatchewan Roughriders, Winnipeg Blue Bombers, Hamilton Tiger-Cats, Toronto Argonauts, Ottawa Rough Riders and Montreal Alouettes—from its 1958 inception until 1981. After the 1981 season, the Alouettes folded and were replaced the next year by a new franchise named the Concordes.

In 1986 the Concordes were renamed the Alouettes to attract more fan support, but the team folded the next year. The loss of the Montreal franchise forced the league to move its easternmost Western team, Winnipeg, into the East Division from 1987 to 1994.

United States expansion

In 1993, the league admitted its first United States-based franchise, the Sacramento Gold Miners. After modest success, the league then expanded further in the U.S. in 1994 with the Las Vegas Posse, Baltimore Stallions, and Shreveport Pirates. For the 1995 campaign, the American teams were split off into their own South Division, and two more teams, the Birmingham Barracudas and Memphis Mad Dogs, were added; at the same time, the Posse folded and the Gold Miners relocated to become the San Antonio Texans. In 1995, the Stallions became the only non-Canadian team to win the Grey Cup.

Despite all American teams having the advantage of not being bound to the CFL's minimum Canadian player quotas, only the Stallions proved to be an on-field and off-field success. The establishment of the NFL's Baltimore Ravens, worsening financial problems among the league's core Canadian teams, and the inconsistent performance of the other American teams prompted the CFL to abandon its American experiment and retrench its Canadian operations. The Stallions organization was used as the basis for a revival of the Montreal Alouettes.

Post-U.S. expansion era
The CFL returned to an all-Canadian format in 1996 with nine teams; the league conducted a dispersal draft to distribute players from the disbanded American-based teams; however, the Ottawa Rough Riders, in existence since 1876, folded after the 1996 season (another dispersal draft was conducted the next year to distribute the former Rough Rider players among the remaining eight teams). Toronto and recently revived Montreal also were struggling; Montreal's woes were solved by moving to Percival Molson Memorial Stadium, a much smaller venue than the cavernous Olympic Stadium. The Winnipeg team again moved to the East Division from 1997 to 2001 to make up for the loss of Ottawa.

In 1997, the NFL provided a  interest-free loan to the financially struggling CFL. In return, the NFL was granted access to CFL players entering a defined two-month window in the option year of their contract. This was later written into the CFL's collective bargaining agreement with its players. The CFL's finances have since stabilized and they eventually repaid the loan. The CFL–NFL agreement expired in 2006. Both leagues have been attempting to reach a new agreement, but the CFL broke off negotiations in November 2007 after Canadian telecommunications firm Rogers Communications paid $78 million to host seven Bills games in Toronto over five seasons (the last Bills Toronto Series game was played during the 2013 NFL season).

In 2002, the league expanded back to nine teams with the creation of the Ottawa Renegades. After four seasons of financial losses, the Renegades were suspended indefinitely before the 2006 season; their players were absorbed by the remaining teams in a dispersal draft. Winnipeg was moved to the East Division again in 2006, a situation that continued until 2013.

In 2005, the league set an all-time attendance record with a total attendance of more than 2.3 million. In June 2006 the league announced the launch of CFL Broadband, an internet streaming service designed to provide fans with another media platform, in addition to TSN and CBC broadcasts, to watch games live.

Mark Cohon era (2007–2015)
With Mark Cohon as commissioner of the league the CFL entered a period of stability and growth. New television deals, two new collective bargaining agreements, the 100th Grey Cup celebration, and widespread stadium renovation and rebuilding highlighted this era. The 100th anniversary of the Grey Cup had the highest ever television ratings for a championship game in English Canada.

During the 2000s the CFL had the third highest per-game attendance of any North American sports league and the seventh highest per-game attendance of any sports league worldwide. A 2006 survey conducted at the University of Lethbridge confirmed that the CFL was the second most popular sports league in Canada, with the following of 19% of the total adult Canadian population compared to 30% for the NHL. The NFL had 11% following, with a total of 26% following at least one of the pro football leagues. In other words, approximately 80% of Canadian football fans follow the CFL, and about 55% follow the NFL. With the absence of Ottawa from 2006 to 2013, league attendance hovered around the 2 million mark. It stood at 2,029,875 in 2012 for a single game average of 28,193. The 2007 season was a recent high point with average game attendance of 29,167, the best since 1983.

During Mark Cohon's time in office many of the teams either undertook major renovations to their existing stadiums, or constructed brand new stadiums. The Montreal Alouettes were the first to undertake this project, adding 5,000 seats to Percival Molson Memorial Stadium in time for the 2010 CFL season. The Edmonton Eskimos and Calgary Stampeders also renovated their respective stadiums and facilities for the 2010 season. In 2011, the BC Lions played under a new, retractable roof in BC Place after spending one and a half seasons at Empire Field. In 2013, the Winnipeg Blue Bombers moved to Investors Group Field, now known as IG Field, an entirely new stadium at the University of Manitoba. The Hamilton Tiger-Cats began using their new stadium, Tim Hortons Field, after spending 2013 at University of Guelph's stadium and the first half of the 2014 season at McMaster University's football field following the demolition of the iconic Ivor Wynne Stadium.

In 2014 the Ottawa Redblacks kicked off their inaugural season (having been awarded a franchise in 2008), becoming the third Ottawa franchise in CFL history. The new Ottawa franchise returned the league to a nine-team structure, with five teams in the West Division and four in the East; the Winnipeg Blue Bombers moved back to the West Division.  The expansion Ottawa Redblacks played at the massively renovated Frank Clair Stadium, now branded as TD Place Stadium.

In Mark Cohon's last year as commissioner he negotiated a new five-year collective bargaining agreement (from 2014 through the 2018 season) between the CFL and the Canadian Football League Players' Association (CFLPA).

Jeffrey Orridge era (2015–2017)
The Toronto Argonauts entered a period of transition off the field, with new ownership and a new stadium. The Argonauts were sold by politician/businessman David Braley to Bell Media and MLSE chairman Larry Tanenbaum. At the start of the 2016 season the Argos moved to BMO Field after more than twenty seasons at the Rogers Centre (formerly called the SkyDome from 1989 to 2005). Construction on the New Mosaic Stadium for the Saskatchewan Roughriders was completed in October 2016 and the first game was played in the 2017 season.

In 2015, Michael Sam signed a two-year contract with Montreal Alouettes of the CFL, becoming the first openly gay player in the league's history. Sam left the team the day before the first preseason game, citing personal reasons.  As reported by Fox Sports, Sam returned to Montreal to continue his professional football career. He left again on August 14, this time permanently, again citing personal reasons.

Immediately following the 2015 season Jeffrey Orridge announced a re-branding for the CFL, including a new logo, motto, uniforms for all nine teams and website. After not having a drug enforcement policy in effect for the 2015 season the league and the CFLPA agreed to a new drug policy. In 2017, the Board of Governors and Jeffrey Orridge agreed to part ways, effective June 30, 2017; Orridge cited "differing views on the future of the league" between him and the Board of Governors for the departure, with both sides stating the decision was mutual and amicable. His last day as commissioner was June 15, 2017. Jim Lawson, the CFL's Chair of the Board of Governors, took over the duties of interim Commissioner until a suitable replacement was found.

Randy Ambrosie era (2017–present)
On June 29, 2017, the CFL announced Randy Ambrosie would succeed Orridge as CFL commissioner. The move was made official on July 5, with Ambrosie named as the 14th commissioner of the league. Having spent nine seasons as a player with the Calgary Stampeders, Toronto Argonauts and Edmonton Eskimos from 1985 to 1993, Ambrosie is the first commissioner to have played in the league since Larry Smith left the position in 1997.

On September 12, 2018, it was announced that Buffalo, New York-based New Era Cap Company would become the official apparel supplier of the CFL beginning in 2019, replacing Adidas.

In October 2018, the CFL began focusing marketing internationally again after the unsuccessful expansion into the United States during the 1990s, with Ambrosie's plan being called CFL 2.0. Ambrosie partnered with the Professional American Football League of Mexico (LFA) for player development, as part of the league's plan to expand globally. Ambrosie also later announced a special edition of the CFL Combine to be held in 2019 in Mexico for Mexican players, which was held on January 13, 2019. Ambroise said he wished the combine in Mexico to become annual, and that a combine could be held in Europe. On January 14, 2019, the league held a draft of LFA and Mexican university players where wide receiver Diego Viamontes was the first pick, selected by the Edmonton Eskimos. The CFL announced in February 2019 that German and French football players from the German Football League and the  would participate in the CFL national combine. Throughout early 2019, Ambrosie actively travelled Europe forming partnerships between the CFL and top-level European American football leagues and associations, specifically Germany (GFL), Austria (AFL), France (FFFA), the Nordic countries (NL, VL, SS, and NAFL), and Italy (IFL). By January 2020 football leagues from 13 countries had signed partnerships with the CFL, these partnerships included mutual exchanging of players and coaches with leagues like the Mexican LFA holding reserved roster spots for Canadians with up to 25 playing in the league's 2020 season. In February 2020, the CFL expanded its global alliance system, welcoming the Japanese X-League, generally regarded the third-best professional gridiron league in the world. This coincided with the CFL announcing that its global combine in 2020 with new rules, including two designated active-roster international players and three practice-squad international players with as many as 45 global players in the league.

The league took over operations of the Montreal Alouettes prior to the 2019 season after Robert C. Wetenhall, the league's last non-Canadian owner, surrendered the franchise to the league in May. The Alouettes found new ownership in January 2020 in Crawford Steel executives Sid Spiegel and Gary Stern, whose holding company S and S Sportsco would oversee the team.

On August 17, 2020, the CFL cancelled its 2020 season after coronavirus-related social distancing mandates and travel restrictions imposed in most of Canada prevented the league from selling tickets and the league was unable to secure a bailout from the federal government to cover any losses. It was the first cancelled season in the league's history, and the first year without a Grey Cup championship since the canceled 1916–1919 seasons. The league returned in 2021, playing a shortened 14-game schedule which began that August, with the season concluding with the Grey Cup game in December for the first time since 1972. On March 10, 2021, the then-on hiatus XFL announced that it was in talks with the CFL over the possibility of a future collaboration; these discussions were called off four months later with nothing coming of them.

On August 29, 2022 Gary Stern of the Montreal Alouettes announced that he was stepping away from day-to-day operations with the club and resigning from his role with the Canadian Football League’s board of governors, effective immediately. On February 14, 2023, the ownership of the Alouettes was transferred back to the CFL. Mario Cecchini was appointed as the interim President while the league sought to finalize a sale to new ownership. On March 10, 2023, the CFL announced that Quebec media mogul and former Parti Québécois leader Pierre Karl Péladeau had purchased the team.

Teams

Active teams

Future teams

Defunct teams

Proposed and disbanded teams

Notes

Timeline

Note: team franchise history is listed as it is recognized by the CFL in its publication CFL Guide and Record Book (2017).

Potential expansion
Potential CFL expansion markets are the Maritimes, Quebec City, Saskatoon, London, and Windsor, all of which have been lobbying for Canadian Football League franchises in recent years. During the 1970s and 1980s, Harold Ballard attempted multiple times (albeit all unsuccessfully) to secure a second CFL team for Toronto (either by way of expansion or by relocating the Hamilton Tiger-Cats), under the premise that Canada's largest city could support two teams.

Maritimes
Since the 1980s, the CFL has occasionally played exhibition and, later, regular-season games at various cities in the Maritimes, including Canada Games Stadium in Saint John, New Brunswick; Huskies Stadium in Halifax, Nova Scotia; and Moncton Stadium in Moncton, New Brunswick. The league conditionally approved an expansion franchise, the Atlantic Schooners, for play in the 1984 season, but the team never made it to play after plans for a stadium collapsed.

No city in the Maritimes has a permanent stadium that meets CFL standards. As of 2010, the largest stadium in the Maritimes is Croix-Bleue Medavie Stadium, which has 10,000 permanent seats and is expandable to 20,000 with temporary seats. A pre-season game, dubbed Touchdown Atlantic, was held in Halifax in the 2005 CFL season and regular season games were played in Moncton under the same branding in 2010, 2011, and 2013. All 20,000 seats for the 2010 Moncton game sold out in 32 hours; the 2013 game did not sell out. Former Commissioner Mark Cohon said that Moncton Stadium would require massive renovations to host a CFL team permanently. The cost of the required renovations would be the equivalent of building a brand-new stadium. In November 2015 the Halifax city council voted 9–7 against purchasing land that would then be used to build a 20,000-seat stadium. It was agreed that the price tag for the land was too much, but the close vote indicated municipal interest in building a near CFL sized stadium in Halifax.

Atlantic Schooners revival

In November 2017, the CFL conducted further discussions with a group in Halifax interested in securing a franchise for the city; the group made a "very credible" pitch to the CFL head office. According to TSN analyst Dave Naylor the group named 'Maritime Football Ltd.' consists of Anthony LeBlanc (former president and CEO of the NHL's Arizona Coyotes), Bruce Bowser (president of AMJ Campbell Van Lines) and Gary Drummond (former president of hockey operations for the Coyotes). In June 2018 the group met with the Halifax Regional Council in private about plans to bring a CFL team to Halifax, with the possibility of playing at Université de Moncton while a stadium in Halifax is being built. Maritime Football Ltd. ownership group selected a site in Shannon Park, Dartmouth, Nova Scotia to develop a new stadium. The stadium was estimated to cost between $170 to $190 million, seat 24,000 and have a business model similar to the Ottawa Redblacks, who entered the league in 2014. On October 30, 2018, Halifax City Council unanimously voted in favour of proceeding with a business case analysis of a stadium in the Halifax municipality. Following this positive momentum, Maritime Football Ltd. and CFL commissioner Randy Ambrosie announced that the group would proceed with a season ticket drive to further gauge interest, and also running a team name contest in the hopes of making an announcement on the team name just prior to the 106th Grey Cup game. The target year for the proposed team to enter the league was 2021, with the team name including "Atlantic" in its name, but no franchise was actually awarded in this announcement. Further to the previous discussions with Moncton and New Brunswick politicians, it was also suggested that the potential new franchise could begin play in Moncton while the stadium in Halifax is built. On November 23, 2018, two days before the 106th Grey Cup, Maritime Football Ltd., since renamed Schooners Sports and Entertainment, and commissioner Ambrosie announced the new team would be called the Atlantic Schooners.

Quebec City
There has been interest in adding a team in Quebec City. In 2003, an exhibition game was held at Telus Stadium between the Montreal Alouettes and Ottawa Renegades where Montreal won 54–23. In 2008, the federal government rejected a proposal that could have paved the way for a CFL franchise in Quebec City, saying Ottawa is not in the business of subsidizing professional sports. The following year in May 2009, Christina Saint Marche, a British businesswoman, announced her interest in operating a team in Quebec City—stating that there would be a natural rivalry with the Montreal Alouettes.  During the 2010 Grey Cup state of the league news conference, Cohon noted that the Alouettes hold the rights for the entire province of Quebec and that any expansion would have to be negotiated with them first.  Another exhibition game was held at Telus Stadium on June 13, 2015, with Ottawa (whose TD Place Stadium was in use by the 2015 FIFA Women's World Cup) hosting Montreal.

Saskatoon
Saskatoon last hosted top-level Canadian football in 1935 when the Regina Roughriders left the Saskatchewan Rugby Football Union to form the WIFU. The Saskatoon Hilltops (along with another Saskatchewan-based team, the Moose Jaw Millers) eventually suspended operations due to World War II; the Hilltops remained an amateur team when they returned in 1947 (they have since played in the Canadian Junior Football League). Saskatoon last won a provincial title in 1921. By the time they resumed play after the war, the Roughriders had been the dominant team in the province for two decades.

In early 2012, management at Credit Union Centre publicly expressed its desire to bring a CFL team to Saskatoon. However, the Regina-based Saskatchewan Roughriders have long branded themselves as a province-wide team, and claimed that the population of Saskatchewan is too small to support two teams.  In any event, Saskatoon also lacks a suitable outdoor stadium. Its largest, Griffiths Stadium, home of the University of Saskatchewan's Saskatchewan Huskies, seats only 6,171 spectators. The Gordie Howe Bowl, which has hosted CFL exhibitions in the past, has even fewer seats (it seats 3,950 people).

Mexico
While not openly being considered for franchise expansion, Mexico was suggested by Commissioner Randy Ambrosie as a possible location for neutral site regular season games (similar to the NFL's Mexico Series) as early as 2019, as well as potentially partnering with the LFA for player development, as part of the league's plan to expand globally. Ambrosie also later announced a special edition of the CFL Combine to be held in 2019 in Mexico for Mexican players, and in 2019, the league held a draft of LFA and Mexican university players. In March 2019, Commissioner Randy Ambrosie told the media that after the LFA combine, multiple parties inquired about purchasing a franchise for Mexico. Ambrosie reiterated that the league had no intention to expand internationally at this time.

Season structure

Since 2018, the CFL season has included:
 A two-game, three-week exhibition season (or pre-season) in mid-June
 An 18-game, 21-week regular season running from late June to early November
 A six-team, three-week single elimination playoff tournament beginning in November and culminating in the Grey Cup championship in late November. Championship teams will play either two or three playoff games, including the Grey Cup game, depending on their standing at the end of the regular season. The division leaders at the end of the regular season receive byes in the first round of the playoffs.

Preseason
Team training camps open 28 days prior to the first regular season game of the season, a camp solely devoted to first year players is allowed the 3 days before the main camp opens. The pre-season exhibition schedule is two weeks long with each team playing two games against teams from its own division.

Regular season
The regular season is 21 weeks long, with games beginning in mid-June and finishing by early November. The CFL's nine current teams are divided into two divisions: the East Division with four teams and the West Division, with five teams. Each team plays two games against each of the other eight teams, plus two divisional games with opponents rotating each season. With 18 regular season games being played, each team gets three bye weeks.

The most popular featured week in the CFL season is the Labour Day Classic, played over the course of the Labour Day weekend, where the matchups feature the first half of home-and-home series between the traditional geographic rivalries of Toronto–Hamilton (a rivalry which began in 1873), Edmonton–Calgary (see Battle of Alberta), Winnipeg–Saskatchewan, and Ottawa–Montreal. In years that Ottawa or Montreal were not in the league, BC played against one of these teams. The following week's rematch of these games is a popular event as well, especially in recent years, where the rematch of the Saskatchewan–Winnipeg game has been dubbed the Banjo Bowl.

Other features of the regular season schedule are the Hall of Fame Game and the Thanksgiving Day Classic, the doubleheader held on Thanksgiving where the match ups usually do not feature traditional rivalries. From 2010 to 2013, a neutral site regular season game was played in Moncton under the name Touchdown Atlantic.

The league awards points based on regular season results (much like in most ice hockey leagues, but unlike the NFL, which strictly uses winning percentages to determine their standings; two points are awarded for a win, one for a tie and none for a loss). As of the 2021 season, in the event two or more teams in a division finish the season with the same number of points, the tie is broken based on the following criteria (in descending order), with coin tosses used if all such tie-breaker steps fail:
 Number of wins in all games;
 Winning percentage in games between the tied teams;
 Net aggregate of points scored (i.e. total points scored less total points conceded) between the tied teams;
 Net quotient of points scored (i.e. total points scored divided by total points conceded) between the tied teams;
 Winning percentage in divisional games;
 Net aggregate of points scored in divisional games;
 Net quotient of points scored in divisional games;
 Net aggregate of points scored in all games;
 Net quotient of points scored in all games.

Playoffs
The playoffs take place in November. After the regular season, the top team from each division has an automatic home berth in the division final, and a bye week during the division semifinal. The second-place team from each division hosts the third-place team in the division semifinal, unless a fourth-place team from one division finishes with a better record than a third place team in the other (this provision is known as the crossover rule, and while it implies that it is possible for two teams in the same division to play for the Grey Cup, only three crossover teams have won a semifinal since the rule's 1996 inception, and neither advanced to the Grey Cup). The winners of each division's semifinal game then travel to play the first place teams in the division finals. Since 2005, the division semifinals and division finals have been sponsored by Scotiabank. The two division champions then face each other in the Grey Cup game, which, since 2007, has been held either on the fourth or fifth Sunday of November; for 2021, the game was played in December, the first time this had happened since 1972.

Grey Cup

The Grey Cup is both the name of the championship of the CFL and the name of the trophy awarded to the victorious team. The Grey Cup is the second-oldest trophy in North American professional sports, after the Stanley Cup. The Grey Cup game is hosted in one of the league's member cities. In recent years, it has been hosted in a different city every year, selected two or more years in advance. The Toronto Argonauts have won the most Grey Cups with 18 wins total, most recently in 2022. In 2012, the game was held in Toronto at Rogers Centre, and for the second year in row the cup was won on a team's home field, with Toronto beating Calgary 35–22. In 2013, the Grey Cup was won at home for the third consecutive time (by the Saskatchewan Roughriders), which had not been done since Toronto won at home from 1945 to 1947. In 2016, the Grey Cup was won on the natural grass turf of BMO Field by the Ottawa Redblacks beating the heavily favoured Calgary Stampeders 39–33 in overtime; the first Grey Cup championship for any Ottawa CFL team in 40 years.

As the country's single largest annual sporting event, the Grey Cup has long served as an unofficial Canadian autumn festival generating national media coverage and a large amount of revenue for the host city. Many fans travel from across the country to attend the game and the week of festivities that lead up to it. A 2014 survey found that 48% of Canadians would prefer to watch the Grey Cup over the Super Bowl if they could only watch one or the other, with 52% preferring the Super Bowl.

Since 2015, the Grey Cup game's presenting sponsor is Shaw Communications.

Awards
Following the Grey Cup game, the Grey Cup Most Valuable Player and Grey Cup Most Valuable Canadian are selected. A number of league individual player awards, such as the Most Outstanding Player and Most Outstanding Defensive Player, are awarded annually at a special ceremony in the host city during the week before the Grey Cup game; this ceremony is broadcast nationally on TSN. The Annis Stukus Trophy, also known as the Coach of the Year Award, is awarded separately at a banquet held during the off-season each February. While the CFL has not held an all-star game since 1988, an All-Star Team is selected and honoured at the league awards ceremony during Grey Cup week.

Broadcasting

The CFL Championship game, the Grey Cup, previously held the record for the largest television audience in Canadian history. Television coverage on CBC, CTV and Radio-Canada of the 1983 Grey Cup attracted a viewing audience of 8,118,000 people as Toronto edged B.C. 18–17, ending a 31-year championship drought for the Argonauts. At the time, this represented 33% of the Canadian population. This has since been surpassed by the 2002 and 2010 Men's Olympic Gold Medal Hockey Game.

Canadian broadcasters
Currently, the official television broadcasters of CFL games are cable network TSN (which began televising CFL games in 1985), while TSN's French-language network RDS broadcasts Montreal Alouettes games for the Quebec television market. Games are typically scheduled for Thursday to Saturday evenings during June, July and August, but switch to more Saturday and Sunday afternoon games during September and October. TSN has created a tradition of at least one Friday night game each week, branded as Friday Night Football. CBC and TSN drew record television audiences for CFL broadcasts in 2005. The 2006 season was the first season in which every regular-season game was televised, as the league implemented an instant replay challenge system. In 2006, the CFL also began offering pay-per-view webcasts of every game on CFL Broadband. Until the end of the 2007 season, CBC and RDS were the exclusive television broadcasters for all playoff games, including the Grey Cup, which regularly draws a Canadian viewing audience in excess of 4 million.

In 2008, the CFL began a new, five-year television deal with CTVglobemedia. Valued at $16 million per-year, it gave TSN and RDS exclusive rights to all CFL games, including the playoffs and Grey Cup. In March 2013, TSN exercised an option to extend its contract through 2018. In 2015, the deal was extended for an additional three years, along with exclusive Grey Cup rights for Bell Media Radio stations.

Foreign coverage
In 2013, the CFL announced that its U.S. broadcast rights would return to the ESPN Networks for the 2013 season, with five games airing on ESPN2, and 55 airing on ESPN3. This agreement was renewed in 2014 for five years, the same length as the TSN deal (ESPN holds a stake in TSN), with a stipulation that at least 17 games would be carried on ESPN2 (or another ESPN network, such as ESPN or ESPNEWS) each season, including the Grey Cup; this gives ESPN exclusive CFL rights during this time frame. Originally ESPN3 carried all games not carried on one of the linear channels online, later ESPN moved those games to ESPN+.

ESPN has had a long relationship with the CFL; the channel broadcast its first CFL game on July 9, 1980, when the network was only 10 months old.

ESPN Brasil began broadcasting CFL games live in Brazil in 2015, as a result of the growth of the NFL and College Football fan base in Brazil. BT Sport, which has a licensing partnership with ESPN, has also carried CFL games in Britain and Ireland since 2015.

In June 2019, the CFL signed a broadcast deal with MVS Comunicaciones to broadcast one game a week in Mexico on MVS TV.

Previous broadcasting arrangements

Canada

The public broadcaster CBC Television, which held a monopoly on Canadian television until 1961, held Canadian professional football broadcast rights beginning the year of its debut, 1952. The private, commercial CTV network was created in 1961 in part because Toronto businessman John Bassett had won the television rights to the Eastern Football Conference, and needed an outlet to air the games. From 1962 through 1986, CBC and CTV shared CFL broadcasting rights. They split playoff games and simulcast the Grey Cup. In 1962, 1965, 1967, 1968 and 1970, CTV commentators were used for the dual network telecast, while in 1963, 1964, 1966 and 1969, the CBC's announcers were provided. From 1971 through 1986, one network's crew called the first half while the other called the other half. After the 1986 season, CTV dropped coverage of the CFL and the Grey Cup. From 1987 through 1990, the CFL operated its own syndicated network, CFN. Like CTV, CFN split playoff games with CBC. However, CFN had completely separate coverage of the Grey Cup, utilizing its own production and commentators. From 1991 to 2007, all post-season games had been exclusively on CBC; beginning in 2008, the Grey Cup and all other CFL games are exclusive to cable TV on TSN, although the cable provider reserves the right to move the game to sister network CTV (as of 2022, it has never done so, opting to broadcast that Sunday's NFL games on CTV instead.)

United States
The predecessor to the CFL's East Division, the IRFU, had a television contract with NBC in 1954 that provided far more coverage than the NFL's existing contract with DuMont. NBC aired games on Saturday afternoons, competing against college football broadcasts on CBS and ABC. The revenue from the contract allowed the IRFU to directly compete against the NFL for players in the late 1950s, setting up a series of CFL games in the United States beginning in 1958 and a series of interleague exhibitions beginning in 1959. Interest in the CFL in the United States faded dramatically after the debut of the American Football League in 1960.

In 1982, during a players' strike in the NFL, NBC broadcast CFL games in the United States in lieu of the NFL games which were cancelled; the first week of broadcasts featured the NFL on NBC broadcast teams, before a series of blowout games on the network and the resulting low ratings resulted in NBC cutting back and eventually cancelling its CFL coverage after only a few weeks. ESPN host Chris Berman became a fan of the game in the early days of ESPN, when the network first aired CFL games, and continues to cover the Canadian league on-air. The now-defunct FNN-SCORE (unrelated to the Canadian cable network formerly known as The Score [now Sportsnet 360]) carried games in the late 1980s. In the late 1980s and early 1990s, SportsChannel America carried games, using CBC Television, CFN and TSN feeds. In 1993, several SportsChannel Pacific-produced games that were part of the Sacramento Gold Miners' local package were also shown nationally.

Beginning in 1994, with now four US-based teams in the league, ESPN reached a four-year deal with the league to produce and air two games per week and all post-season games on its fledgling ESPN2. They also put some games on the main network to fill broadcast time vacated by the 1994–95 Major League Baseball strike. The 1994 and 1995 Grey Cups were shown live on ESPN2 and then re-aired on ESPN the following day, leading into the network's Monday Night Countdown show. ESPN's on-air talent included a mix of the network's American football broadcasters and established CFL broadcasters from Canada. Most of the US-based teams also had deals with local carriers to show games that were not covered in the national package. Though there were no US teams in the league after 1995, ESPN2 continued showing games until 1997, albeit on a much lighter schedule.

The now-defunct America One network held CFL broadcast rights in the United States from 2001 to 2009 and aired a majority of the league's games. Until the 2007 season, America One syndicated CFL games to regional sports networks like Altitude, NESN, and MASN; these were discontinued in 2008, mainly because America One and the CFL were able to reach a deal only days before the season began, not allowing the network time to establish agreements with individual RSNs. The Grey Cup aired on Versus on November 22, 2008, with a replay the next day on America One. From 2006 through the 2008 season, Friday Night Football was carried exclusively on World Sport HD in the United States; however, due to the January 2009 shutdown of that channel's parent company, Voom HD Networks, America One reclaimed those rights.

NFL Network took over the league broadcast contract in 2010. For the 2010 season, the network carried 14 games, no more than one each week. For 2011, the network increased its output to two games each week. NFL Network declined to continue its coverage after the 2011 season. It offered to pick up another package in 2019 on the condition that the league change its schedule to not directly compete with the NFL regular season, something that the CFL stated needs to be negotiated with the players' union.

In late July 2012, NBC Sports Network acquired rights to the CFL for the remainder of the 2012 season. The NBCSN deal included nine regular season games starting August 27 (including Labour Day Classic games) and all the playoffs. NBC Sports renewed their agreement with the CFL for the 2013 season.

The European ESPN America network carried a collection of CFL games as part of its lineup until the network shut down in 2013.

As of 2022, games are broadcast on ESPN2.

Internet
There are no blackout restrictions on radio broadcasts of CFL games, while TSN streams all games online for authenticated subscribers to participating television providers.

The majority of games not on ESPN television channels are streamed in the United States via the subscription service ESPN+.

In 2017, the league announced a partnership with Yare Media to offer subscription streaming packages in 130 international territories.

Radio
CFL teams have individual local broadcast contracts with terrestrial radio stations for regular season and playoff games, while TSN Radio owns the rights to the Grey Cup. In 2006, Sirius Satellite Radio gained exclusive rights for North American CFL satellite radio broadcasts and broadcast 25 CFL games per season, including the Grey Cup, through 2008. Sirius would later extend its radio coverage through 2010, after which it merged with former rival XM Radio Canada to form Sirius XM Canada. English language broadcasts of every CFL game air on Canada Talks, with French-language broadcasts of the Montreal Alouettes broadcast on Influence Franco.

Players and compensation

Compensation and revenue
The CFLPA agreed to include a provision allowing the CFL to enforce a salary cap in the 2002 Collective Bargaining Agreement (CBA), but the league began enforcing it only from the 2007 season ($4.05 million per team) onward. The cap was raised to $4.2 million in the 2008 season and remained at that level for 2009. Financial penalties for teams that breach the cap are set at $1 to $1 for the first $100,000 over, $2 to $1 for $100,000 to $300,000 over, and $3 to $1 for $300,000 and above. Penalties could also include forfeited draft picks. On June 29, 2010, a new collective bargaining agreement was ratified that raised the salary cap to $4.25 million for the 2010 CFL season and continued to increase by $50,000 each season until 2013. In 2014, a new CBA was ratified and the salary cap was raised to $5 million per team, with that amount increasing again by $50,000 each year until 2018. As per the 2019 collective bargaining agreement, the 2021 salary expenditure cap is scheduled to be $5,350,000 and with the minimum team salary set at $4,750,000. The salary cap number was subject to increase as players now have revenue sharing of 20% from broadcast deals (outside of TSN and ESPN), but since the league did not play in 2020, the cap number will likely be static.

For 2010, the minimum team salary was set at $3.9 million while the minimum player salary was set at $42,000. With the new CBA in 2014, the salary floor was raised to $4.4 million per team with increases of $50,000 per year, and the minimum salary was raised to $50,000 per year. A new collective bargaining agreement was signed in 2019 that set the minimum annual player salary at $54,000, with that number increasing to $65,000 for National and American players in 2020. In 2019, Mike Reilly and Bo Levi Mitchell were the highest paid players in the CFL after signing contracts in February 2019 for average yearly salaries of over $700,000. Players designated as global players (see player designations) are paid the league minimum by rule and may have a portion of their salary sent back to their original home league as part of a partnership with the CFL.

Player compensation is not tied to league revenue, which remains a trade secret. Only the four publicly held teams in the league reveal their financial information, as those companies are required to do so under Canadian law. As of 2019, five of the CFL's nine teams (including all three community-owned franchises) are profitable, and four operate at a loss; those four teams lose more than the five profitable teams, resulting in a net loss of approximately  overall.

Player designations
Players in the CFL carry nationality designations referring to their country of origin: Nationals ("a Canadian citizen at the time of signing his first contract, was classified as a non-import prior to May 21, 2019, was physically resident in Canada for an aggregate period of five years prior to reaching the age of 18, or played football for a minimum of three years at a U Sports institution, was draft eligible in 2021 at a minimum, and has graduated with a degree at that institution"), Americans (non-National and non-Global players, almost exclusively used for United States citizens), and Globals (any player who does not hold Canadian or American citizenship and does not qualify as a National in any other way). In prior versions of the CFL CBA and league rules, National players were known as non-import players and American players were known as international (2014–2018) and import (before 2014) players, with the criteria to qualify as a non-import player being more restrictive. Global players were introduced in 2019.

National players enter the CFL through the CFL Draft or free agency. Global players enter the CFL in a similar method as national players, with exclusive drafts held only for eligible players. American players are typically inducted by way of the negotiation list: any team can lay unilateral claim to up to 45 players that have never played in the CFL at any given time (each team must make at least ten of those names public as of 2018), with no limit on how long a player can be held on the list and no limit on how old the player must be (thus CFL teams can claim players not yet eligible for the NFL Draft). Once a player on a negotiation list expresses formal interest in joining the CFL, that team has up to ten days to offer a contract (usually a league-minimum, two-year contract) to retain the player's rights. Other than the names that are made public, the full list of names league-wide are a secret held from the general public and even from the other teams, with teams only finding out if a player is on another team's negotiating list if the league office tells them.

Roster limits
In 2006, the active roster limit was increased from 40 to 42, in 2014 it was again increased to 44, and in 2016 was increased to 46. An unlimited number of players may be put on a team's disabled, injured and suspended lists.

As of 2021, each team must abide by the National/American/Global ratio rule, which requires teams to have two quarterbacks, two Global players, and a maximum of 20 American players (excluding quarterbacks) with a minimum of 44 total Active Roster players and a maximum of 45. Each team will also have one player of any nationality on the Reserve Roster who receives the benefits of being on the Active Roster, but may not play in a game.

Through the 2018 season, quarterbacks, of which a team was required to carry three on a roster, were not allowed to be counted toward the national player requirement nor the starter requirement, which put Canadian quarterbacks at a disadvantage compared to other positions in being hired by a CFL franchise. This rule was changed in 2019 whereby teams had two roster spots for quarterbacks and a third quarterback counted in the ratio. Additionally, a National quarterback would be considered one of the club's National Starting Players as long as he remains on the field at the quarterback position.

Teams are additionally allowed up to 10 national or international players (with a minimum of one national if there are less than seven players or two nationals if there are at least seven players total) on their practice squad roster and may expand it to 12 if the team carries the maximum allowed two global practice squad players, though they are not required to do so. Every year, the practice squad roster is temporary increased in size to 15 following the start of the National Football League's season to accommodate for the influx of cut NFL players. Unlike players on the active roster, players on the practice squad may be signed at any time to another team's active roster without compensation to the player's original team.

Labour representation
CFL players are represented by the Canadian Football League Players' Association (CFLPA). Each team elects two players to the CFLPA Board of Player Representatives, which meets once per year. Every two years, it elects an executive Board of Directors.

CFL Draft

Eligible Canadian nationals (usually from U Sports football domestically or American college football) are drafted by teams in the annual CFL Draft. The draft usually takes place in May and currently consists of eight rounds. The first two rounds of the draft are usually shown live on TSN. The CFL Combine (formerly known as the CFL Evaluation Camp), similar to the NFL Combine, precedes the draft. A junior player in the locale of a team may be claimed as a territorial exemption and sign with that team before beginning collegiate play (one recent example is when the BC Lions claimed Andrew Harris). Teams maintain "negotiation lists" of players they wish to sign as free agents.

League commissioners

See also

 Canadian Football Act
 Canadian Football League attendance
 List of Canadian Football League mascots
 List of Canadian Football League records
 List of Canadian Football League seasons
 List of Canadian Football League stadiums
 List of Grey Cup champions
 List of professional sports teams in the United States and Canada
 Major professional sports leagues in the United States and Canada
 Sports in Canada
 TSN Top 50 CFL Players

References

Further reading

External links

Official
 
 French Website
 Canadian Football League Players Association

Media
 TSN
 SLAM! Sports 
 Rogers Sportsnet
 Score Media

Other
 CFLapedia

 
1958 establishments in Quebec
Canadian football leagues
Professional sports leagues in Canada
Sports leagues established in 1958
Organizations based in Toronto